Hafursey is an inselberg in Southern Iceland.

Location
Hafursey lies to the north of the black outwash plain of Mýrdalssandur, south of a side glacier of the Mýrdalsjökull, called Kötlujökull.

Shape
The mountain, which is approximately triangular in shape, has some peaks and is also divided into two parts by a gorge called Klofgil. This extends as much of a mountain as a whole from southeast to north-west. The western part of Hafursey is the highest and is called Skálafjall, to the north is a secondary peak called Kistufell.

Geology
The mountain was created during the Ice Age and consists of palagonite.

However, it probably does not belong to Katla, but feeds from its own source of magma. One can imagine its origin in one or more eruptions similar to that of Surtsey, but it far surpasses this real island in size. In addition, it was not born in the sea, but under an Ice Age glacier.

After the end of the Ice Age, the mountain was temporarily an island, which is still recognisable, hence the name. However, in the case of an island of a special kind, the numerous jökulhlaups of the Katla repeatedly remade it and contributed to its erosion. Kötlujökull plays a leading role in this, because it has the largest amount of glacier ice and water, which can then be released with a volume of up to 100,000 or even 200,000 m2 / sec. running over the outwash plain.

Agricultural benefits
The land is fertile and good pastureland. For this reason, the farmers of the now abandoned farm Hjörleifshöfði used the mountain as a summer pasture for their sheep.

Accommodation for travellers
In earlier times the main route to southeast Iceland was across Mýrdalssandur at the foot of the mountain, a shelter was built there at the beginning of the 20th century. Previously, travelers had used the Stúka cave on the mountain for the same purpose.

Hiking

In popular culture
The area was used for location filming for the 2016 Star Wars spinoff film Rogue One.

See also
Geography of Iceland
List of volcanoes in Iceland

References

Mountains of Iceland
Mountains under 1000 metres
Inselbergs of Iceland